The 2022–23 Baltic Men Volleyball League, known as Credit 24 Champions League for sponsorship reasons, was the 18th edition of the highest level of club volleyball in the Baltic states.

This season was not attended by Lithuanian teams and the overall participation dropped to 7 teams – 4 from Estonia and 3 from Latvia.

References

External links
Official website

Baltic Men Volleyball League
Baltic Men Volleyball League
Baltic Men Volleyball League
Baltic Men Volleyball League
Baltic Men Volleyball League
Baltic Men Volleyball League
Baltic Men Volleyball League
Baltic Men Volleyball League